Brava is the debut studio album by French electronic producer Brodinski. It was released through Parlophone, Warner Music and his label Bromance on 3 March 2015.

Background
The album was described as "infused... with all the influences that have fueled him over the years." AllMusic reviewed the album, stating it consists of "a unique voice, one that's choppy, quirky, welcoming, and likely smells of blunts when it burps." PopMatters suggested the album is "a reminder that Brodinski helped plant the seed but is perhaps not the right gardener to help it grow." Billboard called the album a "hazy, seductive blend of trap and techno." while Clash Music asserted the album to be "one of the year's most disposable albums".

Track listing
Adapted from Apple Music and Qobuz.

All tracks composed by Brodinski, Myd and Kore (credited as Louis Rogé, Quentin Lepoutre and Djamel Fezari respectively) except "Warm Up" co-composed by Ravid Kahalani.

Charts

References

2015 debut albums
Brodinski albums
Warner Records albums